Devise may refer to:
 To invent something
 A disposal of real property in a will and testament, or the property itself which has been disposed of
 Devise, Somme

See also
 Device (disambiguation)
 Devizes (town in Wiltshire in England)